Saddle Creek Records is an American record label based in Omaha, Nebraska. Started as a college class project on entrepreneurship, the label was founded by Mike Mogis and Justin Oberst in 1993 (as Lumberjack Records). Mogis soon turned over his role in the company to Robb Nansel. The label is named after Saddle Creek Road, a major street that cuts through Midtown Omaha, and the beginnings of a scene whose members included Justin's brother Conor Oberst (then a solo artist, currently of Bright Eyes, Conor Oberst and the Mystic Valley Band, Desaparecidos, and Monsters of Folk), Tim Kasher (then of Slowdown Virginia, currently of Cursive and The Good Life), and others. Collectively, they were known unofficially as the "Creekers". Saddle Creek first appeared in print on a show flyer, offering to "Spend an evening with Saddle Creek" (later to be the title of the label's DVD.) Saddle Creek became an incorporated entity as a result of a class project on entrepreneurship. Distribution is handled by Redeye Distribution.

Saddle Creek Records continues to be the flagship label of a style of music called "The Omaha Sound", characterized by a slight country twang. This is increasingly inaccurate, though, with the rise of more electronic sounds such as those favored by The Faint and Broken Spindles. The eclectic sounds of Saddle Creek's disparate member bands is somewhat explained by their history; a number of the original members of the label attended grade school together. A "sister label", of sorts, to Saddle Creek is Team Love, started by Conor Oberst in 2004.

History
The label opened arms to their first bands not based in Omaha in 2001 with releases by Now It's Overhead and Sorry About Dresden.  Other non-Nebraskan artists followed, including Los Angeles's Rilo Kiley, Eric Bachmann (formerly leader of Archers of Loaf and Crooked Fingers from North Carolina), Georgie James (Washington D.C.), Two Gallants (San Francisco), and most recently Tokyo Police Club (Toronto).

In 2005, Spend an Evening with Saddle Creek, a documentary detailing the first ten years of the record label's history, was released. The DVD features extensive interviews with the Saddle Creek bands, archival footage, and rare live performances.

On June 8, 2007, the label opened their own music venue named Slowdown (after the group Slowdown Virginia), located in downtown Omaha, Nebraska.

The label's name was inspired partially by the A-side single of Polecat's 1994 -ismist Recordings release 2500 Ft of Our Love, "Saddle Creek."

Bands

 Art in Manila
 Azure Ray
 Beep Beep
 Big Thief
 Black Belt Eagle Scout
 Bright Eyes
 Criteria
 Cursive
 Desaparecidos
 Feeble Little Horse
 Hop Along
 The Good Life
 Icky Blossoms
 Indigo De Souza
 Ladyfinger (ne)
 Eastern Youth
 Eric Bachmann
 Land of Talk
 Maria Taylor
 Mayday

 Miles Benjamin Anthony Robinson
 The Mynabirds
 Neva Dinova
 Now It's Overhead
 Old Canes
 Orenda Fink
 Palm
 The Rural Alberta Advantage
 Sebastien Grainger
 Sam Evian
 Shalom
 Son, Ambulance
 Sorry About Dresden
The Spirit of the Beehive
 Stef Chura
 The Thermals
 Tim Kasher
 Tokyo Police Club
Tomberlin
 Young Jesus

Past bands
Broken Spindles
Commander Venus
The Faint
Gabardine
Georgie James
Park Ave.
Polecat
Rilo Kiley
Slowdown Virginia
Two Gallants
We'd Rather Be Flying

Discography

 
LBJ-034  Bright Eyes/Son, Ambulance - Oh Holy Fools: The Music of Son, Ambulance & Bright Eyes CD/LP
LBJ-035  Cursive - Burst and Bloom CD/LP
LBJ-036  Son, Ambulance - Euphemystic CD/LP
LBJ-037  The Faint - Danse Macabre CD/LP
LBJ-038  Now It's Overhead - Now It's Overhead CD/LP
LBJ-039  Sorry About Dresden - The Convenience of Indecision CD
LBJ-040  Desaparecidos - The Happiest Place on Earth CD5
LBJ-041  Azure Ray - November EP CD
LBJ-042  Desaparecidos - Read Music/Speak Spanish CD/LP
LBJ-043  The Good Life - Black Out CD/LP
LJB-044  Mayday - Old Blood CD
LBJ-045  Bright Eyes - There Is No Beginning To The Story EP CD/12"
LBJ-046  Bright Eyes - Lifted or The Story Is in the Soil, Keep Your Ear to the Ground CD/2×LP
LBJ-047  Rilo Kiley - The Execution of All Things CD/LP
LBJ-048  Bright Eyes - A Christmas Album CD
LBJ-049  Cursive - Art Is Hard CD
LBJ-050  Various Artists - Saddle Creek 50 2×CD/LP
LBJ-051  Cursive - The Ugly Organ CD/LP
LBJ-052  Sorry About Dresden - Let It Rest CD
LBJ-053  Bright Eyes - Vinyl Box Set 5×LP + 2x12" + box set
LBJ-054  Azure Ray - Hold On Love CD/LP
LBJ-055  Azure Ray - The Drinks We Drank Last Night CD
SCE-056  Rilo Kiley - The Execution of All Things CD
LBJ-057  Azure Ray - New Resolution CD
LBJ-058  Now It's Overhead - Fall Back Open CD
LBJ-059  Cursive - The Recluse CD
SCE-060  Bright Eyes/Neva Dinova - One Jug of Wine, Two Vessels CD/LP
LBJ-061  Broken Spindles - fulfilled/complete CD/LP
LBJ-062  The Good Life - Lovers Need Lawyers CD/10"
LBJ-063  Beep Beep - Business Casual CD/LP
LBJ-064  The Good Life - Album of the Year CD/LP
LBJ-065  Now It's Overhead - Wait in a Line CD
LBJ-066  The Faint - I Disappear CD
LBJ-067  The Faint - Wet From Birth CD/LP
LBJ-068  Bright Eyes - Lua CD
LBJ-069  Bright Eyes - Take It Easy (Love Nothing) CD
LBJ-070  Cursive - The Difference Between Houses and Homes CD/LP
LBJ-071  Son, Ambulance - Key CD
LBJ-072  Bright Eyes - I'm Wide Awake, It's Morning CD/LP
LBJ-073  Bright Eyes - Digital Ash in a Digital Urn CD/LP
LBJ-074  Maria Taylor - 11:11 CD
LBJ-075  Orenda Fink - Invisible Ones CD
LBJ-076  Mayday - Bushido Karaoke CD
LBJ-077  Bright Eyes - When the President Talks to God iTunes exclusive
SCE-079  Bright Eyes - First Day of My Life CD/7"
LBJ-080  Criteria - En Garde (reissue) CD
LBJ-081  Criteria - When We Break CD/LP
LBJ-082  Broken Spindles - inside/absent CD/LP
LBJ-083  The Faint - Desperate Guys CD
LBJ-084  Bright Eyes - Easy/Lucky/Free CD/2×7″
LBJ-085  Criteria - Prevent the World CD
LBJ-086  Orenda Fink - Bloodline iTunes single
LBJ-087  Various Artists - Lagniappe
SCE-088  Bright Eyes - Motion Sickness: Live Recordings CD
LBJ-089  Saddle Up and Love It - Saddle Creek/Lovitt Records Hot Topic Compilation CD
LBJ-090  Two Gallants - Las Cruces Jail 7-inch
LBJ-091  Two Gallants - What the Toll Tells CD/LP
SCE-092  Two Gallants - Steady Rollin' iTunes Exclusive
LBJ-093  Cursive - Dorothy at Forty CD/7"
LBJ-094  Cursive - Happy Hollow CD/LP
LBJ-095  Eric Bachmann - To The Races CD
LBJ-096  Now It's Overhead - Dark Light Daybreak (Live in the Studio) iTunes Exclusive
LBJ-097  Now It's Overhead - Dark Light Daybreak CD
LBJ-098  Ladyfinger - Heavy Hands CD
LBJ-099  Bright Eyes - Noise Floor: Rarities 1998-2005 CD, 2*LP
LBJ-101  Bright Eyes - Four Winds CD/12"
LBJ-102  Maria Taylor - Lynn Teeter Flower CD
LBJ-103  Bright Eyes - Cassadaga CD/2×LP
SCE-104  Cursive - Big Bang digital single
LBJ-105  Two Gallants - The Scenery of Farewell CD/12"
LBJ-106  The Good Life - Heartbroke 7-inch/Digital Single
LBJ-107  Art in Manila - Set the Woods on Fire CD
LBJ-108  The Good Life- Help Wanted Nights CD/LP
LBJ-109  Two Gallants - Two Gallants CD/LP
LBJ-110  Georgie James - Places CD/LP
SCE-111  Two Gallants - Despite What You've Been Told Digital Single
SCE-112  Georgie James - Need Your Needs Digital Single
SCE-113  Richard Swift - Dressed Up for the Letdown CD
LBJ-114  Cursive - Rhapsody Original EP Digital
LBJ-115  Cursive - Bad Sects 12-inch
LBJ-116  Tokyo Police Club - Elephant Shell CD/LP
LBJ-117  Neva Dinova - You May Already Be Dreaming CD/LP
LBJ-118  Georgie James - Cake Parade 7-inch/Digital
LBJ-119  Tokyo Police Club - Elephant Shell (Remixes) Digital
LBJ-120  Son, Ambulance - Someone Else's Deja Vu CD/LP
LBJ-121  Tokyo Police Club - Tessellate 7-inch
SCE-122  Two Gallants - Miss Meri Digital Single
LBJ-123  Beep Beep - Enchanted Islands CD
LBJ-124  Neva Dinova - Neva Dinova (2009 Reissue) Digital
LBJ-125  O+S - O+S CD/LP
LBJ-126  Land of Talk - Some Are Lakes CD/LP
LBJ-127  Sebastien Grainger - American Names 7-inch/Digital EP
LBJ-128  Sebastien Grainger - Sebastien Grainger & The Mountains CD/LP
LBJ-129  Ladyfinger (ne) - Dusk CD
LBJ-130  Tokyo Police Club - FNMTV Live (Rhapsody Exclusive)
LBJ-131  Tokyo Police Club - Live Session iTunes Exclusive EP
LBJ-132  Cursive - Mama, I'm Swollen CD/LP
LBJ-133  Cursive/Ladyfinger (ne) - Record Store Day Picture 10-inch
LBJ-134  Sebastien Grainger - Who Do We Care For Digital Single
LBJ-135  Tokyo Police Club - Baskervilles Remix Digital Single
SCE-136  Dag för Dag - Shooting from the Shadows CD EP
LBJ-137  UUVVWWZ - UUVVWWZ CD
LBJ-138  The Rural Alberta Advantage - Hometowns CD/LP
LBJ-139  Orenda Fink - Ask The Night CD/LP
LBJ-140  Old Canes - Feral Harmonic CD/LP
LBJ-141  O+S - We Do What We Want to Digital
LBJ-142 Miles Benjamin Anthony Robinson - Summer of Fear CD/LP/Digital
LBJ-143 Land of Talk - Fun & Laughter EP CD/Digital
LBJ-144 The Rural Alberta Advantage - Drain the Blood 7-inch/Digital
LBJ-145 Bright Eyes / Neva Dinova - One Jug of Wine, Two Vessels CD/LP/Digital (2010 Reissue)
LBJ-146 The Mynabirds - What We Lose in the Fire We Gain in the Flood CD/LP/Digital
LBJ-148 Cursive - Discovering America Digital Single
LBJ-149 Land of Talk - Cloak and Cipher CD/LP/Digital
LBJ-150 Land of Talk - Swift Coin 7-inch/Digital
LBJ-151 Tim Kasher - Cold Love 7-inch/Digital
LBJ-152 Tim Kasher - The Game of Monogamy CD/LP/Digital
LBJ-153 Adam Haworth Stephens - We Live on Cliffs CD/LP/Digital
LBJ-154 Azure Ray - Don't Leave My Mind Digital Single
LBJ-155 Tim Kasher - Delirium Tantrums 7-inch (online-store exclusive)
LBJ-156 The Mynabirds - All I Want is Truth (for Christmas) 7-inch/Digital
LBJ-157 The Rural Alberta Advantage - Departing CD/LP/Digital
LBJ-158 Bright Eyes - The People's Key CD/LP/Digital
LBJ-159 Bright Eyes - Singularity Digital
LBJ-160 Azure Ray (feat. Sparklehorse) - Silverlake Digital

Compilations
Saddle Creek Records, A Sampler (1998)
Saddle Creek 50 (2002)
Lagniappe: A Saddle Creek Benefit for Hurricane Katrina (2005)

See also
List of record labels
Team Love Records
Range Life Records
Slumber Party Records
Lightspeed Champion

References

External links
 Saddle Creek Records official website
 Lazy-i Interview: August 2001 with Robb Nansel
 Lazy-i Interview: September 2004 with Rilo Kiley
 Lazy-i Interview: March 2005 with Robb Nansel and Jason Kulbel

 
Conor Oberst
Record labels established in 1993
American independent record labels
Companies based in Omaha, Nebraska
Music of Omaha, Nebraska
Indie rock record labels